Louis ("Loet") Geutjes (born August 12, 1943 in Amersfoort, Utrecht) is a former water polo player from The Netherlands, who finished in seventh position with the Dutch Men's Team at the 1968 Summer Olympics in Mexico City. After an active career as water polo player, Geutjes became a successful swimming coach, first with AZ&PC Amersfoort, and currently with De Otters Het Gooi Bussum. He has trained and coached several athletes that went on to perform at international level, such as the twins Mildred and Marianne Muis, and Chantal Groot.

References
 Dutch Olympic Committee

1943 births
Living people
Dutch male water polo players
Olympic water polo players of the Netherlands
Water polo players at the 1968 Summer Olympics
Sportspeople from Amersfoort
20th-century Dutch people